CCFA is an acronym which may refer to:
 Crohn's and Colitis Foundation of America

See also
 CFA (disambiguation)
 CCFAN